Srivastav or Shrivastava or Srivastava is a surname. Notable people with the surname include:

Aadesh Srivastav (1964–2015), music composer and singer of Indian music
Aanjjan Srivastav (1948), Indian film, television and stage actor
Aarti Shrivastava (born 1983), Indian documentary filmmaker
Aditya Srivastav, Indian actor in Hindi cinema
Aditya Shrivastava (cricketer) (born 1993), Indian cricketer
Alankrita Shrivastava (born 1979), Indian screenwriter, director and producer
Alok Shrivastava (born 1964), Indian media producer
Ashvarya Shrivastava (born 1992), Indian tennis player
Babu Chotelal Shrivastava (1889–1976), freedom fighter in Chhattisgarh
Chitragupta Shrivastava (1917–1991), Indian film music director in Hindi cinema and Bhojpuri cinema
Manindra Mohan Shrivastava (born 1964),  Indian judge
Nitin Shrivastava, Indian urologist and academic
Paul Shrivastava (born 1951), American academic of Indian descent
Pawan K Shrivastava (born 1982), Indian film maker, writer, blogger and activist
Prakash Shrivastava (born 1961), Indian Judge
S. K. Shrivastava, Indian general
Shalabh Shrivastava (born 1986), Indian first-class cricketer
Shambhu Sharan Shrivastava, Bihar politician
Shanvi Srivastav (born 1993), Indian actress and model
Snehlata Shrivastava (born 1957), former Indian Administrative Service officer and civil servant 
Vandita Shrivastava, Indian actress and model
Varun Shrivastava (born 1986), Indian social reformer
Vidisha Srivastav (born 1980), Indian actress 

Hindustani-language surnames
Surnames of Hindustani origin